The 1894–95 Welsh Amateur Cup was the fifth season of the Welsh Amateur Cup. The cup was won by Caergwrle Wanderers who defeated Bangor Reserves 2-1 in the final, at Flint.

First round

Second round

Third round

Fourth round

Semi-final

Final

References

1894-95
Welsh Cup
1894–95 domestic association football cups